Virasana (IAST: vīrāsana) or Hero Pose is a kneeling asana in modern yoga as exercise. Medieval hatha yoga texts describe a cross-legged meditation asana under the same name. Supta Virasana is the reclining form of the pose; it provides a stronger stretch.

Etymology and origins

The name comes from the Sanskrit words वीर vira meaning "hero", and आसन āsana meaning "posture" or "seat"; supta (सुप्त) means "reclined".

The name virasana is ancient, being found in the 8th century Patanjalayogashastravivarana (2.46-48) and the 13th century Vasishthasamhita (1.72), but in those texts the description is of a cross-legged meditation seat. The modern kneeling pose is found in 20th century texts such as B.K.S. Iyengar's Light on Yoga; it is mentioned also in Ashtanga Vinyasa Yoga texts (e.g. Maehle 2011, who recommends it for lengthening the quadriceps muscle).

The yoga scholar Mark Singleton notes that a pose similar to Supta Virasana was described in Niels Bukh's early 20th century Danish text Primitive Gymnastics. Swami Kuvalayananda incorporated Supta Virasana into his system of exercises in the 1920s, from where it was taken up by the influential yoga teacher Tirumalai Krishnamacharya.

Description

Virasana is a basic kneeling asana and the starting position for several forward and backwards bends and certain twists. Virasana may also be used as an alternative to other seated asanas such as the padmasana (lotus pose) for meditation. The pose is entered by kneeling down with the knees together, and separating the feet so that the buttocks can rest on the floor. Beginners may instead place one foot on top of the other and sit on them, or may place a cushion between the feet and sit on that to practice. The pose is one of the few that may be performed straight after eating.

Virasana places the knees at risk of injury if hip extension and rotation are inadequate, in which case the pose requires support under the buttocks to allow the hips to extend. The pose should be avoided if there is any existing knee injury.

Variations

Adho Mukha Virasana (downward facing hero pose) has the body stretching forward and down, the hands reaching forward to the ground. It is a good counterpose following chest opening asanas. In addition, it can also be used as a recovery position throughout a challenging sequence. Therapeutic applications include releasing the spine, helping to alleviate lower back pain, and shoulder opening 

Supta Virasana (reclining hero pose) has the body reclining on the back, the hands either beside the thighs or stretched over the head.

Eka Pada Supta Virasana (One-Legged Reclining Hero Pose) or Ardha Supta Virasana (Half Reclined Hero Pose) has one leg folded under the body while the other is being stretched.

Light on Yoga shows Yogadandasana as a variant of Virasana, one bent leg being rotated inwards until the foot supports the armpit on the same side.

See also

 List of asanas
 Simhasana, Lion pose, which has the legs in Virasana
 Vajrasana, Thunderbolt pose, another kneeling asana

References

Sources
 
 
 

Buddhist meditation
Sitting asanas
Kneeling asanas
Medieval Hatha Yoga asanas

it:Virasana